The 32nd American Society of Cinematographers Awards were held on February 17, 2018, at the Hollywood & Highland Ray Dolby Ballroom, honoring the best cinematographers of film and television in 2017.

The nominees for film and television were announced on January 9, 2018.

Winners and nominees

board of directors Award
 Awarded to director and actress Angelina Jolie.

Film

Outstanding Achievement in Cinematography in Theatrical Release
 Roger Deakins, ASC, BSC – Blade Runner 2049
 Bruno Delbonnel, ASC, AFC – Darkest Hour
 Hoyte van Hoytema, ASC, FSF, NSC – Dunkirk
 Dan Laustsen, ASC, DFF – The Shape of Water
 Rachel Morrison, ASC – Mudbound

Spotlight Award
The Spotlight Award recognizes outstanding cinematography in features and documentaries that are typically screened at film festivals, in limited theatrical release, or outside the United States.

 Mart Taniel – November
 Máté Herbai, HSC – On Body and Soul
 Mikhail Krichman, RGC – Loveless

Television

Outstanding Achievement in Cinematography in Regular Series for Non-Commercial Television
 Adriano Goldman, ASC, ABC – The Crown (Episode: "Smoke and Mirrors") (Netflix)
 Gonzalo Amat – The Man in the High Castle (Episode: "Land O’ Smiles") (Amazon)
 Robert McLachlan, ASC, CSC – Game of Thrones (Episode: "The Spoils of War") (HBO)
 Gregory Middleton, ASC, CSC – Game of Thrones (Episode: "Dragonstone") (HBO)
 Alasdair Walker – Outlander (Episode: "The Battle Joined") (Starz)

Outstanding Achievement in Cinematography in Regular Series for Commercial Television
 Boris Mojsovski, CSC – 12 Monkeys (Episode: "Thief") (Syfy)
 Dana Gonzales, ASC, ABC – Legion (Episode: "Chapter 1") (FX)
 David Greene, ASC, CSC – 12 Monkeys (Episode: "Mother") (Syfy)
 Kurt Jones – The Originals (Episode: "Bag of Cobras") (The CW)
 Crescenzo Notarile, ASC – Gotham (Episode: "The Executioner") (Fox)

Outstanding Achievement in Cinematography in Television Movie, Miniseries, or Pilot
 Mathias Herndl, AAC – Genius (Episode: "Chapter 1") (National Geographic)
 Pepe Avila del Pino – The Deuce (Episode: "Pilot") (HBO)
 Serge Desrosiers, CSC – Sometimes the Good Kill (Lifetime)
 Shelly Johnson, ASC – Training Day (Episode: "Apocalypse Now") (CBS)
 Christopher Probst, ASC – Mindhunter (Episode: "Episode 1") (Netflix)

Other awards
 Lifetime Achievement Award: Russell Carpenter, ASC
 Career Achievement in Television: Alan Caso, ASC
 International Award: Russell Boyd, ASC, ACS
 Presidents Award: Stephen Lighthill, ASC

References

2016
2017 film awards
2017 television awards
American
2017 in American cinema